Philippe Hersent (26 July 1912 – 30 December 1982) was a French actor. He appeared in more than eighty films from 1930 to 1978.

Filmography

References

External links 

1912 births
1982 deaths
French male film actors